Fred West (17 December 1929 – 24 November 2011) was an Australian rules footballer who played with Collingwood in the Victorian Football League (VFL). He went to Box Hill in 1954.

Notes

External links 

Profile at Collingwood Forever

1929 births
2011 deaths
Australian rules footballers from Victoria (Australia)
Collingwood Football Club players
Box Hill Football Club players